Marion "Penny" Sage (born 26 March 1943 in Cape Town) is a South African figure skater. She represented South Africa at the 1960 Winter Olympics where she placed 23rd.

References

 Sports-reference profile

South African female single skaters
1943 births
Living people
Olympic figure skaters of South Africa
Figure skaters at the 1960 Winter Olympics
Sportspeople from Cape Town